The First Interstate Center, or First Interstate Bank Building, is a building in the heart of Downtown Missoula, Montana. It is located at 310 West Front Street. It is one of many post-modern buildings recently built in Missoula.

Purpose 
The Missoula Downtown Master Plan — which the Missoula Downtown association has created — seeks to redevelop Missoula's historic buildings, and encourage new development of buildings such as this one in the cities downtown.

Sale 
The First Interstate Bank Building in Downtown Missoula is now for sale/lease. The price is not yet known but the entire 2-6 floors are now up for sale/lease.

See also 
Missoula, Montana

References 

Buildings and structures in Missoula, Montana
Office buildings completed in 2009
2009 establishments in Montana
Postmodern architecture in the United States